Almond Lake also known as Almond Reservoir is a man-made lake located by Almond, New York. Fish species present in the lake include largemouth bass, yellow perch, black crappie, and pumpkinseed sunfish. There is access via boat launch in Kanakadea Recreation Area.

References

Lakes of New York (state)
Lakes of Steuben County, New York